Praia Inhame is a beach in the southernmost part of the island of São Tomé in São Tomé and Príncipe. It lies directly east of the southernmost point of the island,  Ponta Homem da Capa, and 2 km southwest of the village Porto Alegre. There is an eco lodge near the beach. The Canal das Rolas separates it from Ilhéu das Rolas.

A new species of snake was found near the beach in 2017. It was named Naja peroescobari, named after the 15th century Portuguese explorer Pêro Escobar.

See also
List of beaches of São Tomé and Príncipe

References

Beaches of São Tomé and Príncipe
Caué District